Passion Island may refer to:

 An alternative name for Clipperton Island
 Passion Island (film), a 1927 British drama film
 Isla de Pasion, a tourist attraction in Cozumel, Mexico